Syuzanna Melqonyan (born 1993), is an Armenian singer. She took part in Hay Superstar, 
The Voice of Armenia, X-Factor and Depi Evratesil. During Depi Evratesil she was in the group of Inga Arshakyan and advanced to the top 3. On July 30, she and the Freedom band were the special guests of Arena Live hosted by Garik Papoyan. On May 5, she published her first music video "I found love" via her YouTube account, which was written by Ellen Nahapetyan. In 2017, Melkonyan represented Armenia along with Erna Mir at the New Wave international contest in Sochi and gained the second place. She also took part in the competition called 1 in 360, a national final to select San Marino's entry for the Eurovision Song Contest 2018. The singer is a Grand Prix winner of various contests and festivals since 2011.

Filmography

References

1993 births
Living people
Musicians from Yerevan
Armenian pop singers
The X Factor contestants
21st-century Armenian  women singers
Armenian Apostolic Christians
Armenian women singer-songwriters